The 1968–69 season was Cardiff City F.C.'s 42nd season in the Football League. They competed in the 22-team Division Two, then the second tier of English football, finishing fifth.

The team enjoyed nearly no success in cup competitions as they were knocked out in their first match of every cup apart from the Welsh Cup which they went on to win by beating local rivals Swansea Town in the final.

John Toshack would go on to finish the season with a total of 31 goals in all competitions, equalling the record set by Hughie Ferguson in the 1926–27 season that would not be beaten until
2003 when Robert Earnshaw finished with a total of 35 goals.

Players

League standings

Results by round

Fixtures and results

Second Division

League Cup

FA Cup

European Cup Winners Cup

Welsh Cup

See also
List of Cardiff City F.C. seasons

References

Welsh Football Data Archive

Cardiff City F.C. seasons
Association football clubs 1968–69 season
Card